Peter Zuze Air Force Base is an airbase located in the city of Ndola in the Copperbelt Province in northern Zambia. It used to be the premises of the Simon Mwansa Kapwepwe International Airport until late 2021, when Ndola's airport moved its operations  to the west (adjacent to the Dag Hammarskjöld Crash Site Memorial) and this old airport address ceased to be a commercial airport. It now belongs to the Zambian Air Force.

On 30 July 2021, President Edgar Lungu decided to name this airbase after Zambia's first indigenous air commander, Peter Zuze. On 5 August 2021, President Edgar Lungu commissioned the opening of the new airport adjacent to the Dag Hammarskjöld Crash Site Memorial, although it took another two months for all operations to complete moving to the new Simon Mwansa Kapwepwe International Airport from the old location (Peter Zuze Air Force Base).

History 

That new airport was built to replace this airport as the main airport of the region.

The new airport was engineered by the Aviation Industry Corporation of China (AVIC International) at a cost of $397 million. It was expected to be completed in Mid-2020 but was delayed by setbacks due to the COVID-19 pandemic; the new airport opened the following year instead. While under construction, the new airport's name was Copperbelt International Airport and was renamed to Simon Mwansa Kapwepwe International Airport upon opening.

On 30 July 2021, President Edgar Lungu declared the old airport in Itawa as an airbase (handed over to the Zambian Air Force) and renamed it the Peter Zuze Air Force Base, named after Zambia's first indigenous air commander, Peter Zuze. On 5 August 2021, President Edgar Lungu commissioned the opening of the new airport adjacent to the Dag Hammarskjöld Crash Site Memorial and immediately, it took the name Simon Mwansa Kapwepwe International Airport from the old airport address.

So, the name Copperbelt International Airport only applied to the new airport while it was under construction (not in use any longer) and the name Simon Mwansa Kapwepwe International Airport remained, meaning that Ndola retained the name that it has been using since 2011 to refer to its International Airport. The new airport also keeps the same IATA code. Peter Zuze Air Force Base was accepted as the name of the old airport.

See also
Simon Mwansa Kapwepwe International Airport
Transport in Zambia
List of airports in Zambia

References

External links
OpenStreetMap - Ndola

Airports in Zambia
Defunct airports
Ndola